Tårs is a Danish town with a population of 1,873 (1 January 2022) situated in Vendsyssel, the northern part of Jutland. Tårs is a part of Hjørring Municipality.

History
The name of the village probably originates from the Nordic god Thor. The area was in 1264 mentioned as Thorse, which could mean Thor's sanctuary.

Notable people 
 Eigil Nielsen (1948 in Tårs – 2019) a Danish footballer who played as a midfielder, mainly in Switzerland
 Sisse Fisker (born 1976 in Tårs) a Danish TV presenter

References

Cities and towns in the North Jutland Region
Hjørring Municipality